Ultimate Yokota 1991–2019 is a compilation album by Japanese house producer Shinichiro Yokota released by Dutch-based Japanese label Sound of Vast on October 21, 2019. The album includes tracks from Do It Again and Again and  I Know You Like It, which were previously unavailable in vinyl form. Half had been produced in the early 90's while five tracks had been produced since 2016, with the track "Tokyo 018 being his and fellow producer Soichi Terada's first work in 15 years. When describing the album, Yokota commented that it was his "30 years chronicle."

The album was rated #3 on DJ Mag's top 25 compilations of 2019 and had the song "Bells" ranked at #5 for Magnetic Magazine's 15 best bass music tracks of October 2019.

Composition and recording 
The album includes 12 tracks, split between two vinyl discs and six tracks in each. It includes six tracks from Do It Again and Again and six tracks from I Know You Like It. It also includes "Tokyo 018," which was produced by Yokota and Soichi Terada and was their first collaboration in 15 years.

Critical reception 

The album was met with general positive reviews. Neil Kulkarni of DJ Mag gave the album a 7.0, saying that the album had "bright, brittle, beautifully clear house grooves" with some "nicely dated dub house disco tracks rubbing up against more propulsive newer tracks." Chal Ravens of Resident Advisor said that Yokota's "ear for melody and a snappy sample provides endless variety, but the basic recipe tends to combine the bossy, velvet-lined grooves of classic New York house with a certain Japanese accent—playful earworms and plasticky organs straight from an arcade game, or notes of laidback electro-boogie that make you want to start your engine and cruise through the neon-lit bustle of south Tokyo."

Track listing

References 

2019 compilation albums
Deep house albums